The Rawls Course, located in Lubbock, Texas, United States, is the home of the Texas Tech Red Raiders golf teams. It is an NCAA championship course constructed through a major gift from Jerry S. Rawls and supported by revenue from students, faculty, staff, donors, and the general public.

Design
The Rawls Course was designed by Tom Doak of Renaissance Golf Design, Inc., Traverse City, Michigan. Starting from just a cotton field, the course was created to imitate the land east and south of Lubbock, where the Great Plains suddenly begin falling into the valleys and canyons that lead to the Caprock region. Lubbock's strong prevailing winds figured prominently in the course's final design.

Recognition
Turfnet magazine ranked The Rawls Course the third best collegiate course in the United States. Golfweek recognized is as the fourth best collegiate golf course in the nation and, in 2012 and 2013, as the #2 course in the state of Texas. 

Golf Magazine ranked it as the second most affordable U.S. course and placed it twenty-third on their list of top 50 golf courses in the nation for $50 or less. Golf Digest ranked it at #2 among affordable public courses. It also ranked it 19th overall for courses in the state of Texas.

Improvements
In 2012, Texas Tech opened a $3.7 million clubhouse at The Rawls Course. The structure includes a public area as well as separate, private facilities for the university's golf teams.

Events
NCAA Division I Men's Golf Regional: 2015
NCAA Division I Women's Golf Regional: 2005, 2017, 2025 
NJCAA Division I Men's Golf Championship: 2013, 2018

References

External links
Turfnet digital edition; article begins on page 22
Texas Tech Athletics; photos of The Rawls Course

Texas Tech Red Raiders sports venues
Sports venues in Lubbock, Texas
Golf clubs and courses in Texas
College golf clubs and courses in the United States